Ochrodia is a genus of moth in the family Gelechiidae. Although considered valid in most modern sources, it is sometimes listed as a synonym of Ephysteris.

Species
 Ochrodia pentamacula (Janse, 1958)
 Ochrodia subdiminutella (Stainton, 1867)

References

Gnorimoschemini